Manju Kumari Yadav is a Nepalese politician. She is a member of Provincial Assembly of Madhesh Province from Nepali Congress. Yadav is a resident of Sonama Rural Municipality, Mahottari.

References

Living people
1976 births
Madhesi people
21st-century Nepalese women politicians
21st-century Nepalese politicians
Members of the Provincial Assembly of Madhesh Province
Nepali Congress politicians from Madhesh Province